Holly Brubach is an American writer who has written primarily about cultural differences and their impact on people. She has been a staff writer for The Atlantic and The New Yorker. She was also a Style Editor at the New York Times Magazine. She was awarded a Guggenheim Fellowship in 2017.

Books 
Her first book was Choura: The Memoirs of Alexandra Danilova, which won the De La Torre Bueno prize for Best Dance Book in 1986. In 1998, her book Girlfriend: Men, Women & Drag was named by the New York Times as one of the 100 Most Notable Books of the Year. She also wrote an anthology called A Dedicated Follower of Fashion.

Other writing 
Brubach has written for film and television including programs for PBS such as Balanchine. Her freelance article writing has appeared in Vanity Fair, Architectural Digest, The Gentlewoman, Gourmet, Vogue, Golf Digest, and other publications.

References 

20th-century American non-fiction writers
Year of birth missing (living people)
20th-century American women writers
21st-century American non-fiction writers
21st-century American women writers
American women non-fiction writers
Living people